Johann David Schoepff, or Schoepf, or Schöpf, (8 March 1752 – 10 September 1800) was a German botanist, zoologist, and physician.

He was born in Bayreuth and travelled to New York in 1777 as the chief surgeon for the Ansbach regiment of Hessian troops fighting for King George III of the United Kingdom.

During the revolutionary war Schoepff was stationed in Rhode Island. Determined to study the Americas as a scientist once the war ended, he travelled for two years in the United States, British East Florida, and the Bahamas.

He returned to Europe in 1784, where he worked for a time at the United Medical Colleges of Ansbach and Bayreuth. His North American observations are recorded in Travels in the Confederation [1783–1784], which first appeared in English translation in 1911. In 1792, he wrote Historia testvdinvm iconibvs illvstrata (A Natural History of the Turtles, Illustrated with Engravings), illustrated by Friedrich Wilhelm Wunder.

Works
 Materia medica Americana potissimum regni vegetabilis . Lloyd Library, Cincinnati, Ohio 1903 (reproduction of the edition from 1787) Digital edition by the University and State Library Düsseldorf
 
  Digital reproduction Zentral- und Landesbibliothek Berlin: http://nbn-resolving.de/urn:nbn:de:kobv:109-opus-72919

References

External links
 Travels in the Confederation 1783-1784 Journal of Johann David Schoepf

1752 births
1800 deaths
German surgeons
18th-century German botanists
18th-century German zoologists
German travel writers
People from Bayreuth
German male non-fiction writers